Olmeta-di-Capocorso is a commune in the Haute-Corse department of France on the island of Corsica.

The commune is on the west coast of the Cap Corse peninsula.
The Olmeta river flows through the commune and enters the sea in the village of Negru.

Population

See also
Communes of the Haute-Corse department
Torra di Negru

References

Communes of Haute-Corse
Haute-Corse communes articles needing translation from French Wikipedia